Sayyid Javad Khamenei  (7 December 1895 – 5 July 1986) was an Iranian Shia. He was the father of Iran's current supreme leader, Ali Khamenei.

Early life
He was an ethnic Iranian Azeri from the city of Khameneh.
He attended seminary in Najaf, Qom and Mashhad. After finishing his studies, he settled in the vicinity of Ali ibn Musa (al-Ridha) shrine in Mashhad. He was the imam of the Mashhad in an Azeri mosque (without source). He had three daughters from his first marriage, named Alaviyeh, Batoul and Fatemeh Soltan. After the death of his first wife, he married Khadijeh Mirdamadi, an ethnic Persian, with whom he had one daughter (Badri Khamenei) and four sons (Mohammad Khamenei, Ali Khamenei, Hadi Khamenei and Mohammad Hassan Khamenei).

Death
Javad Khamenei died on 5 July 1986. He was buried at the portico, behind Imam Reza Shrine, next to Dar-al-Feiz.

See also

 Khamenei family
 Sayyid
 Family tree of Ali
 Ali Khamenei
 Mohammad Khiabani

References

1895 births
1986 deaths
People from Mashhad
Iranian grand ayatollahs
Iranian Islamists
Al-Husayni family
Iranian people of Arab descent
Shia clerics
Ali Khamenei